The World Rugby Sevens Challenger Series is an annual series of international rugby sevens tournaments run by World Rugby that includes men's and women's events. Sponsored by banking group HSBC, it is the second tier of competition below the World Rugby Sevens Series. Teams on the respective men's and women's tours of the Challenger Series compete for promotion to the first tier as a core team.

The inaugural men's tour for the Challenger Series in 2020 featured events in Chile and Uruguay. Due to the COVID-19 pandemic, World Rugby postponed the final event in Hong Kong until October 2020.

The women's tournament for the Challenger Series in the 2020 season was announced as a stand-alone event hosted in South Africa. On 13 March 2020, due to the COVID-19 pandemic, World Rugby postponed the Challenger Series women's event without rescheduling a future date. Subsequently, as a result of the COVID-19 pandemic, Japan was awarded promotion to the Men's World Rugby Sevens Series as the overall points leader in the Challenger Series. However, no women's team was promoted.

Teams
The 12 men's teams and 12 women's teams expected to compete at the 2023 Challenger Series.

Men's teams

Women's teams

Seasons

2020 

The first season of the challenger series was impacted by the COVID-19 pandemic with the 2020 women's tour to South Africa being cancelled altogether and the men's final knock-out event planned for Hong Kong also cancelled.

The 2020 men's tour was played over two rounds hosted in Chile and Uruguay. Japan, as the top-placed team on the standings after the two completed events, was awarded the Challenger Series title and promoted to the World Rugby Sevens Series as a core team for the 2020–21 season.

2022 

The second season of the Challenger Series was played as a single tournament on 12–14 August 2022 in Santiago, Chile at the Estadio Santa Laura, with the men's and women's winners gaining promotion as core teams on the World Rugby Sevens Series for the 2022–23 season.

2023 
The third season of the Challenger Series will be played over two rounds on 20–22 and 28–30 April in Stellenbosch, South Africa at the Markotter Stadium, with the men's winners gaining qualification to the 2023 core team qualifier event in London, the women's winners will gain qualification as a core team on the World Rugby Sevens Series for the 2023–24 season.

Historical results

Results by season – Men
Summary of the top six placegetters for each series:

Participation History – Men

Results by season – Women
Summary of the top six placegetters for each series:

Participation History - Women

References

Sevens
Rugby sevens competitions
Sports competition series